Rugby League is a sports game video game developed by Sidhe Interactive and published by Tru Blu Entertainment. It was released in 2003 for Microsoft Windows, PlayStation 2, and Xbox. In Australia the game was released under the National Rugby League (NRL) license, but it was released under the title Stacy Jones Rugby League in New Zealand and Super League Rugby League in the UK. It is the first rugby league video game in the series. It was followed by Rugby League 2.

See also

Rugby League (video game series)

References

External links
Sidhe Interactive website
Home Entertainment Suppliers website

Windows games
PlayStation 2 games
Xbox games
2003 video games
2003 in rugby league
Video games developed in New Zealand
Rugby league video games
Video games set in Australia
Video games set in England
Video games set in New Zealand
RenderWare games
Sidhe (company) games
Multiplayer and single-player video games
Tru Blu Entertainment games